Cylindrotoma is a genus of crane fly in the family Cylindrotomidae.

Biology
The larvae of the genus Cylindrotoma live on various flowering plants. Adults are to be found in damp wooded habitats.

Distribution
Asia, North America & Europe. China in the most species rich countries.

Species
C. angustipennis Alexander, 1941
C. aurantia Alexander, 1935
C. borealis Peus, 1952
C. deserrata Alexander, 1972
C. distinctissima (Meigen, 1818)
C. fokiensis Alexander, 1949
C. hypopygialis Alexander, 1938
C. japonica Alexander, 1919
C. megacera Alexander, 1938
C. nigripes Alexander, 1931
C. nigritarsis Alexander, 1957
C. nigriventris Loew, 1849
C. pallidipes Alexander, 1954
C. rufescens Edwards, 1928
C. seticornis Alexander, 1964
C. simplex Alexander, 1972
C. subapterogyne Alexander, 1964
C. taiwania (Alexander, 1929)
C. tarsalis Johnson, 1912
C. trichophora Alexander, 1972

References

Cylindrotomidae
Nematocera genera
Articles containing video clips
Taxa named by Pierre-Justin-Marie Macquart